Barilius bonarensis is a fish in genus Barilius of the family Cyprinidae. It is found in the western Himalaya in India.

References 

Barilius
Fish of India
Fish described in 1912